The Spain women's national football team has represented Spain at the FIFA Women's World Cup on two occasions, in 2015 and 2019.

FIFA Women's World Cup results

Record by opponent

2015 FIFA Women's World Cup

Group E

2019 FIFA Women's World Cup

Group B

Round of 16

2023 FIFA Women's World Cup

Goalscorers

References

 
Countries at the FIFA Women's World Cup